Meymac is a railway station in Meymac, Nouvelle-Aquitaine, France. The station is located on the Le Palais - Eygurande-Merlines and Tulle - Meymac railway lines. The station is served by Intercités (long distance) and TER (local) services operated by the SNCF.

Train services
The following services currently call at Meymac:
local service (TER Nouvelle-Aquitaine) Bordeaux - Brive-la-Gaillarde - Tulle - Ussel
local service (TER Nouvelle-Aquitaine) Limoges - Ussel

References

Railway stations in Corrèze